is a 2000 Japanese film directed by Takashi Miike. Dead or Alive 2: Birds is unrelated to Dead or Alive (1999) or Dead or Alive: Final (2002) except that all three films have Show Aikawa and Riki Takeuchi in them, and they are all directed by Takashi Miike.

Plot
Mizuki is an assassin being contracted by one organised gang in the midst of a yakuza-triad turf war. He is hired to kill an officer in the gang for cash. While setting up his shot, someone else gets to his target first; he seems to recognise the person but can't quite remember who they were. Returning to his base of operations, he lies by saying he was the ultimate killer and taking the money given to him by the contractor. After doing some research, he finds out that the other assassin goes by the name 'Mizuki Kohei' and begins to track him down. While making a booking over the phone he runs into his contractors who attack him, deciding to lay low, he makes the decision to return to his childhood home: an island off the coast of Japan.

The other assassin, fearing the heat of his actions, also decides to go into hiding. After rushing to catch the ferry, Mizuki buys a bowl of noodles and reminisces about how he associates them with childhood trips to the mainland; he and his friends would drink the soup quickly and then leave the tofu until last. This sequence is intercut with the other assassin performing the same action. Mizuki notices the other assassin aboard the ferry and follows him onto the island. Upon confronting him, he reveals his name to be Shuuichi, his childhood friend; the two agree to hold off on the killings and begin to reminisce about their past.

A flashback sequence shows Shuu and Mizuki with their friend Kohei as children playing on the beach. Their life at the orphanage having been routine but welcoming, the orphanage's head being a devout Roman Catholic. Eventually Mizuki is adopted to the mainland while Shuu and Kohei grow older, he sends regular letters, but they eventually stop coming through. It is revealed that many of these letters were faked for a long while after Mizuki's adopted parent takes his own life. Fearing the religious burden having been brought up Catholic and the possibility of facing the bureaucracy of child protective services, Mizuki ran away.

The two assassins reunite with Kohei who takes them to various places on the island from when they were children, including the local school where they reminisce, challenge each other to physical tasks and play football. Kohei puts them up at his house with his pregnant wife, and encourages them to visit the orphanage's old head, who has since suffered horrific burns from an accident, rendering him immobile. After visiting their old guardian, they watch a number of old Super 8 films of their trips and adventures together as children. While they do this, a travelling theatre group arrive on the island and get into an unfortunate accident, leaving two of them unable to perform for the children as planned. Shuu, having stepped outside due to overwhelming emotion, overhears the bad news and offers his and Mizuki's services to the theatre company, to which they agree. Hearing from Kohei how Mizuki and Shuu hijacked their school's production of the Nativity story, the orphanage's new head becomes increasingly worried about Shuu's seemingly innocuous offer to help. The performance goes off without a hitch, while back on the mainland, the gang war becomes increasingly violent and unsustainable.

Kohei's wife sees a newspaper clipping of Shuu's involvement with the initial killings, and one of them witnesses the old orphanage's head watch a news item that identifies them as assassins. Having reflected on their past selves, the two assassins decide to team up and fight the yakuza and triads, taking their money and funnelling it into water and medicinal supplies for children in Africa. They raise an exponential sum of money before it is revealed that Shuu has a deteriorating medical condition. The two assassins are confronted by the last of the gangs' men, they succeed in killing them but are severely wounded. They both decide to return to the island one final time. They order the noodles together, and having finished, Mizuki dies in Shuu's arms. They land on the shore, and Shuu carries Mizuki's body up a tall hillside overlooking the harbour. The film cuts to images of their childhood together before showing both men, dead together on the hillside.

The film cuts to an insert that reads: "WHERE ARE YOU GOING?" before showing Kohei and Chi return from the hospital with their new-born baby.

Cast
 Show Aikawa as Mizuki Okamoto
 Riki Takeuchi as Shuuichi Sawada
 Noriko Aota as Chi, Kōhei's wife
 Edison Chen as Boo
 Kenichi Endō as Kōhei
 Hiroko Isayama
 Masato as Hoo
 Yuichi Minato as Head of orphanage
 Ren Osugi (credited as Red Ohsugi) as Mizuki's stepfather
 Manzō Shinra
 Tomorowo Taguchi as Man with telescope
 Teah as Woo
 Toru Tezuka
 Shinya Tsukamoto as Magician Higashino
 Yoshiyuki Yamaguchi

Other credits
 Produced by:
 Toshiki Kimura: associate producer for Excellent Film
 Mitsuru Kurosawa: executive producer for Toei Video
 Yoshihiro Masuda: producer for Daiei
 Makoto Okada: producer for Toei Video
 Tsutomu Tsuchikawa: executive producer for Daiei
 Film Editing by: Yasushi Shimamura
 Production Design by: Akira Ishige
 Sound Department: Mitsugu Shiratori (sound)

Home media 
Arrow Video released a set of the Dead or Alive trilogy in Region 2 on Blu-ray.

External links 
 
 

Dead or Alive (franchise) films
Films directed by Takashi Miike
Films scored by Chu Ishikawa
Yakuza films
2000 films
Discotek Media
2000s Japanese films